Aparna Pillai, better known mononymously as Aparna, is an Indian actress, who has appeared in Tamil films. She is probably best known for her performances in Pudhukottaiyilirundhu Saravanan and Nenjil.

Career
Aparna Pillai entered the film industry after participating in the Miss Chennai pageant.

In June 2011, she married Bharani, an orthopaedic surgeon, and quit doing films. Post marriage, she pursued dancing and performed in several dance recitals and appeared in a production titled "Kadhal Aaghi Kasindhu". Aparna also entered television and produced several TV programs like Anjarai Petti, before becoming the creative head and director of Aayirathil Oruvan, a reality game show, which was aired on Zee Tamizh.

Filmography

References 

Actresses from Chennai
Indian film actresses
Tamil actresses
Living people
Actresses in Tamil cinema
Actresses in Malayalam cinema
Female models from Chennai
Year of birth missing (living people)
21st-century Indian actresses